Barbara Bradley Hagerty is an American journalist and author. She has been a reporter for NPR since 1995.

Hagerty graduated from Williams College with a degree in economics and afterwards was employed by The Christian Science Monitor. Hagerty traveled in Asia for three years. In 1994, she attended Yale Law School on a one-year Knight Fellowship, where she earned a master in legal studies degree. She began working for NPR in 1995, where she covered the United States Department of Justice. She won the Peabody Award and Overseas Press Club Award with her colleagues for NPR's reporting of the September 11 attacks.

In 2003, Hagerty began covering religion for NPR. Hagerty's religious reporting has won her two Gracie Awards, a National Headliner Award, and a Religion Newswriters Award.

In 2009, Hagerty's book Fingerprints of God was published. In 2016, she published Life Reimagined. She lives in Washington, D.C., and is a contributing writer for The Atlantic.

References

External links

Stories by Barbara Bradley Hagerty, npr.org
Barbara Bradley Hagerty, theatlantic.com

21st-century American non-fiction writers
American women radio journalists
American women writers
The Atlantic (magazine) people
NPR personalities
People from Washington, D.C.
Religion journalists
Williams College alumni
Yale Law School alumni
Living people
Peabody Award winners
Year of birth missing (living people)
21st-century American women writers